Suzanne Gavine-Francis-Hlady (born April 21, 1975 in Barrie, Ontario) is a Canadian bobsledder who has competed since 2001.

Gavine-Hlady finished 13th in the two-woman event at the 2006 Winter Olympics in Turin. She also finished 17th in the two-woman event at the 2005 FIBT World Championships in Calgary. Prior to going into bobsleigh, Gavine-Hlady competed in track and field as a shot putter. Gavine-Hlady also was awarded the track and field award for most improved coach.

Gavine-Hlady resides in Belle River, Ontario and works at Belle River District High School, where she teaches French, science and coaches jumpers. She is currently focusing on her studies in Montreal.

References

External links
 
 

1975 births
Living people
Canadian female bobsledders
Canadian female shot putters
Bobsledders at the 2006 Winter Olympics
Olympic bobsledders of Canada
20th-century Canadian women
21st-century Canadian women